African-American News and Issues (AANI) is a weekly African-American newspaper published in Houston, Texas. The newspaper is distributed to zip codes that have the largest concentrations of African Americans within the state of Texas. Circulation is estimated at 312,818. It has been described as "Texas' widest circulated and read newspaper with a Black perspective."

It was established as a newspaper serving Acres Homes in 1996.

See also

 Houston Forward Times
 Houston Defender
 History of the African Americans in Houston

References

External links
African-American News and Issues website

African-American history in Houston
African-American newspapers
Newspapers published in Houston
Newspapers established in 1996
1996 establishments in Texas
Weekly newspapers published in Texas